Custódio Anão Muchate (born 6 May 1982) is a Mozambique basketball player for Ferroviário de Maputo of the Mozambican Basketball League.  He was a member of the Mozambican national basketball team for 19 years.

Professional career
Since 2013, Muchate plays with Ferroviário de Maputo in the Mozambican Basketball League and FIBA organised tournaments. He was on the Ferroviário roster for the 2021 BAL season.

National team career
Muchate was a member of the Mozambique national basketball team after making his debut at age 19, in 2001. He appeared with his country at the 2005, 2007, 2009, 2013 and 2015 AfroBasket championships. In 2020, he retired from the national team after 19 years.

BAL career statistics

|-
| style="text-align:left;"|2021
| style="text-align:left;"|Ferroviário de Maputo
| 4 || 4 || 29.8 || .364 || .333 || .875 || 7.5 || 2.3 || .0 || .0 || 6.5
|-
|- class="sortbottom"
| style="text-align:center;" colspan="2"|Career
| 4 || 4 || 29.8 || .364 || .333 || .875 || 7.5 || 2.3 || .0 || .0 || 6.5

Personal
Besides playing basketball, Muchate works as a manager at a beer brewing company.

References

External links

1982 births
Living people
Mozambican men's basketball players
African Games silver medalists for Mozambique
African Games medalists in basketball
Competitors at the 2011 All-Africa Games
Centers (basketball)
Ferroviário de Maputo (basketball) players